James Doyle (born 22 April 1988 in Cambridge, England) is a flat racing jockey. He is the son of former trainer Jacqueline Doyle. Since 2014, he has been one of the retained riders to Godolphin Racing in the UK, mainly riding horses trained by Charlie Appleby.

Early life
James Doyle was born on 22 April 1988 in Cambridge, Cambridgeshire, England and is the son of former trainer Jacqueline Doyle and brother of jockey Sophie Doyle. Jacqueline trained Zanay, who won the Winter Derby in 2000. James now lives in Lambourn, Berkshire.

Riding career

Early career
James Doyle had his first ride under rules on 4 June 2004 at Goodwood on Somayda, who was trained by his mother. James Doyle rode his first winner on 1 June 2005, when he partnered the Richard Price trained gelding Farnborough to win a Class 6 Handicap run over an extended mile at Wolverhampton. During 2005, he had eight wins, four of which came on Fabrian, who was also trained by Richard Price. During 2006 he rode 73 winners, with 32 those being on Turf, including the totesport Stakes Heritage Handicap at Windsor, which he won with One More Round. One More Round was trained by Nick Littmoden, who Doyle rode for many times. During 2007 and 2008 he rode 41 and 53 winners respectively. The following two years he did not reach 30 winners in a season, finishing with totals of 28 and 29, and had half the number of rides that he had back in 2006. After struggling to get enough rides, Doyle revealed that he contemplated going on a plumbing course in 2010. However, during 2011, Doyle got booked for many more rides than the previous two years and at the end of the year had won 76 races in the UK, and had also started riding for Roger Charlton. At the end of the 2011 UK flat season, Doyle went to the UAE to ride for Dhruba Selvaratnam, winning his first race in November, and the Listed UAE Cup in December.

Roger Charlton 
Doyle became stable jockey to Roger Charlton in 2012, and on 31 March, scored his first Group 1 success, when he rode Charlton's Cityscape to win the Dubai Duty Free Stakes by over four lengths. By the end of the 2011/12 UAE racing season, Doyle had ridden 23 winners. The following year he won three Group 1 races with Al Kazeem, including the Prince of Wales's Stakes and Eclipse Stakes.

Godolphin 
Since late 2014, Doyle has been one of the retained UK riders for Sheikh Mohammed's Godolphin operation. He originally rode the horses trained in Newmarket by Saeed bin Suroor, while William Buick rode those trained by Charlie Appleby. In 2014, he won the Irish 2,000 Guineas and St James's Palace Stakes with Kingman. In May 2015, he rode Night of Thunder to victory in the Lockinge Stakes. In 2016 he lost his position as first jockey for bin Suroor.

Major wins
 France
 Critérium de Saint-Cloud - (1) -  Gear Up (2020)
 Grand Prix de Saint-Cloud – (1) – Noble Mission (2014) Prix du Moulin – (1) – Ribchester (2017) Prix du Cadran – (1) – Trueshan (2021) Prix Jacques Le Marois – (1) – Kingman (2014) Prix Marcel Boussac – (1) – Wild Illusion (2017) Great Britain
 1000 Guineas Stakes – (1) – Cachet (2022) 2000 Guineas Stakes – (1) – Coroebus (2022) Ascot Gold Cup – (1) – Big Orange (2017) Champion Stakes – (1) – Noble Mission (2014) Platinum Jubilee Stakes / Diamond Jubilee Stakes – (2) – Blue Point (2019), Naval Crown (2022) Eclipse Stakes – (1) – Al Kazeem (2013) Falmouth Stakes – (1) – Amazing Maria (2015) Haydock Sprint Cup – (1) – Hello Youmzain (2019) King George VI and Queen Elizabeth Stakes – (1) – Poet's Word (2018) King's Stand Stakes – (1) – Blue Point (2019) Lockinge Stakes – (1) – Night of Thunder (2015) Prince of Wales's Stakes – (3) – Al Kazeem (2013), Poet's Word (2018), Lord North (2020) St James's Palace Stakes – (2) – Kingman (2014),  Barney Roy (2017) Sussex Stakes – (1) – Kingman (2014) Yorkshire Oaks – (1) – Sea of Class (2018) Ireland
 Irish 2,000 Guineas – (1) – Kingman (2014) Irish Oaks – (1) – Sea of Class (2018) Moyglare Stud Stakes – (1) – Rizeena (2013) Tattersalls Gold Cup – (3) – Al Kazeem (2013, 2015), Noble Mission (2014) United Arab Emirates
 Dubai Duty Free Stakes – (1) – Cityscape (2012) Al Maktoum Challenge, Round 3 – (1) – African Story (2015) Al Quoz Sprint – (1) – Jungle Cat (2018) Jebel Hatta – (2) – Hunter's Light (2015), Blair House (2018) Australia
 Sir Rupert Clarke Stakes – (1) – Jungle Cat (2018) Canada
 Northern Dancer Turf Stakes – (1) – Old Persian (2019) Germany
 Grosser Preis von Berlin - (1) -  Rebel's Romance (2022)  United States
 Breeders' Cup Turf-(1)- Rebel's Romance (2022)''

Statistics

Flat wins in Great Britain by year;

2004 – 0 wins / 16 rides
2005 – 8 / 150
2006 – 73 / 759
2007 – 41 / 624
2008 – 52 / 638
2009 – 28 / 379
2010 – 29 / 360
2011 – 76 / 639
2012 – 80 / 580
2013 – 82 / 602
2014 – 58 / 289 (in progress)

Flat wins in Ireland by year;

2005 – 0 / 1
2008 – 0 / 1
2011 – 0 / 1
2013 – 2 / 3
2014 – 2 / 5 (in progress)

Flat wins in the UAE by season;

2011/12 – 23 / 198
2012/13 – 12 / 170
2013/14 – 13 / 130

References

1988 births
English jockeys
Living people
Sportspeople from Cambridge